The Tumbarumba railway line is a railway line in New South Wales, Australia. 
Proposals were commenced back as early as 1881. The length of an initial proposal showed it to be  in length. The final built length being .

Following heavy rains causing numerous wash-aways services were suspended, although the line is not officially closed (which would require an Act of Parliament). Passenger services on the line in the final years comprised CPH railmotors. The line branched from the Main South line at Wagga Wagga and passed through Tarcutta to the township of Tumbarumba. It opened in stages from 1917 to 1921 and was essentially closed in 1987. Passenger trains ceased operation in 1974 after significant flooding saw much of the line abandoned. In 2001, a large grass fire started by a passing Northbound semi-trailer destroyed the disused Tarcutta railway station before it could be restored by a local historical group. All other stations on the line have been demolished with the exception of Ladysmith (which is maintained by the Ladysmith Tourist Railway Inc. historical group) and Borambola. Although several sections of rail have been removed (albeit without the approval of NSW Railways), much of the line still exists. 
In 2020 the disused 22km section Tumbarumba–Rosewood was graded, surfaced and sealed by the NSW government and Snowy Valleys Council as a pilot "rail trail" for recreational use by walkers, joggers and cyclists; official opening 3 April 2020.

The Tarcutta fires of early 2013 caused significant damage to the small historic halt platform of Edwards Crossing and the surrounding area of railway.

See also

Rail transport in New South Wales
Rail rollingstock in New South Wales

References

Further reading 
 

Closed regional railway lines in New South Wales
Standard gauge railways in Australia
Railway lines opened in 1921